WGHQ (920 kHz) is a commercial AM radio station licensed to Kingston, New York and serving the Hudson Valley.  WGHQ is owned by Pamal Broadcasting  The station airs a mix of adult standards, oldies, and soft adult contemporary formats known as "Magic 92.5". 

WGHQ operates at 1000 watts daytime and 38 watts nighttime, non-directional, from a single tower located south of Port Ewen, New York, while its studios are in Beacon. WGHQ also broadcasts on an FM translator (W223CR) also in Port Ewen, New York at 92.5 FM.

History

WGHQ 920 kHz first signed on the air on March 4, 1956. The original call letters were WSKN licensed to Saugerties, New York with 1000 watts of power, for daytime broadcasting only. Its transmitter and studio were located on the Glasco Turnpike, in the Town of Saugerties.  In 1959 the call letters were changed to WGHQ, the City of License was changed to Kingston, the transmitter site was moved to Route 9W, just south of Port Ewen, NY. The station's operating power was increased to 5,000 watts, still as a daytimer.

WGHQ was the second radio station licensed to Kingston (after WKNY). In 1965, WGHQ-FM was licensed on (later the original WBPM, now WKXP) 94.3 MHz. It was a full-time simulcast the AM's programming for much of the next decade. From its inception, WGHQ aired a somewhat Kingston-centric full service middle of the road format which had a vast daytime advantage to WKNY, but WKNY was a full-time station.

WGHQ kept its focus but rising costs and the decline of full service formats on AM forced the station to drop much of its news coverage and change to an all adult contemporary music format. In 1988, WGHQ was licensed for 78 watts nighttime power, however, the station dropped local programming, going instead to mainly satellite syndicated music programming.

WGHQ aired Adult Standards for most of the 1990s.  In 1999 the family sold WGHQ and WBPM to WRWD/WBWZ local radio owner Roberts Radio Group. This began a period of multiple format changes.  Roberts Radio sold to Clear Channel in mid-2000.  WGHQ became a talk radio station under Clear Channel ownership, airing syndicated talk shows including Rush Limbaugh and Glenn Beck.  WGHQ along with WBPM 92.9 MHz was sold to Pamal Broadcasting in April 2007

Pamal Broadcasting changed the format from talk radio back to Adult Standards in July 2007, simulcasting with co-owned WBNR and WLNA, but keeping locally originated "Kingston Community Radio," produced by Walter Maxwell, in its 7-9 am time slot. See www.mykcr.org In March 2008 the tri-mulcast of WBNR, WLNA and WGHQ changed to a service-oriented talk radio format under the name "Hudson Valley Talk Radio."  HVTR featured non-political syndicated advice hosts Gary Goldberg (financial), Dr. Laura Schlesinger (life advice), Dave Ramsey (Money management) as well as local experts under time brokered arrangements.

On December 20, 2013, Pamal announced that Tri-State Public Communications, which operates WHDD in Sharon, Connecticut and WLHV in Annandale-on-Hudson as public radio station Robin Hood Radio, would acquire WGHQ through a donation.  As of January 1, 2014 WGHQ was re-transmitting Robin Hood Radio programming except during the 7-9 AM time slot Monday thru Friday when The "Kingston Community Radio" program airs on WGHQ.  A local marketing agreement or LMA was in effect until paperwork was filed and approved by the FCC for the donation of WGHQ to Robin Hood Radio.

On March 1, 2016, Tri-State Public Communications ended its lease of the station [8] [9]. Pamal Broadcasting took back programming control of WGHQ and now simulcasts it again with WBNR and WLNA airing the syndicated "Real Country" classic country music format.

On June 28, 2016, Pamal Broadcasting removed two of three towers at the WGHQ transmitter site due to the poor physical condition of the towers.  The station power was reduced to 1000 watts daytime, 38 watts nighttime non-directional from the remaining tower.

In January 2017 Pamal Broadcasting acquired an FM Translator at 92.5 FM to simulcast WGHQ's programming. WGHQ continued to feature the syndicated Real Country format.

On March 15, 2021, in a move to better utilize the AM frequencies and their FM translators, Pamal relaunched WGHQ on its own with a nostalgia/oldies format and rebranded as "Magic 92.5" playing "Great Songs and Magic Memories" from pop vocalists of the 1950s through the 1980s. Meanwhile, sister stations WBNR and WLNA began simulcasting 92.9 WBPM's classic hits format in areas south of Kingston.

Programming
WGHQ features Kingston Community Radio, which airs weekday mornings from 7:00 a.m. to 9:00 a.m and features interviews with local government and business leaders, followed by automated music for the rest of the day.

WGHQ also serves as the flagship station of United States Military Academy football and men's basketball broadcasts, which are produced by Learfield.

References

External links
Magic 92.5 official website
 

GHQ
Mass media in Ulster County, New York
Radio stations established in 1955
Soft adult contemporary radio stations in the United States
Oldies radio stations in the United States
Adult standards radio stations in the United States
Kingston, New York
1955 establishments in New York (state)